Rudolf Frommer (fegyverneki Frommer Rudolf; 4 August 1868 – 1 September 1936) was a Hungarian weapon designer. He was raised to the Hungarian nobility with the pre-name 'fegyverneki' by Franz Joseph I for his achievements in weapons design. He had over 100 patents, among them was the Frommer Stop and the 37M.

Weapon designers
1868 births
1936 deaths
Hungarian inventors